Turgenevo is a rural locality (a village) and the administrative center of Turgenevskoye Rural Settlement, Melenkovsky District, Vladimir Oblast, Russia. The population was 1,150 as of 2010. There are 7 streets.

Geography 
Turgenevo is located on the Rayna River, 20 km northeast of Melenki (the district's administrative centre) by road. Selino is the nearest rural locality.

References 

Rural localities in Melenkovsky District
Melenkovsky Uyezd